OERM may refer to:

 The Orange Empire Railway Museum, a railway and streetcar museum in Perris, California
 The Oregon Electric Railway Museum, a streetcar museum in Brooks, Oregon
 The airport identifier code for Ras Mishab Airport, in Saudi Arabia